In enzymology, a 1-aminocyclopropane-1-carboxylate deaminase is an enzyme that catalyzes the chemical reaction

1-aminocyclopropane-1-carboxylate + H2O  2-oxobutanoate + NH3

Thus, the two substrates of this enzyme are 1-aminocyclopropane-1-carboxylate and H2O, whereas its two products are 2-oxobutanoate and NH3.

This enzyme belongs to the family of hydrolases, those acting on carbon-nitrogen bonds other than peptide bonds, specifically in compounds that have not been otherwise categorized within EC number 3.5.  The systematic name of this enzyme class is 1-aminocyclopropane-1-carboxylate aminohydrolase (isomerizing). This enzyme is also called 1-aminocyclopropane-1-carboxylate endolyase (deaminating).  This enzyme participates in propanoate metabolism.  It employs one cofactor, pyridoxal phosphate.

Structural studies

References

 
 

EC 3.5.99
Pyridoxal phosphate enzymes
Enzymes of known structure